Delanson Historic District is a  national historic district in Delanson, Schenectady County, New York. The district includes 31 contributing buildings on 19 properties.  The buildings were built between about 1860 and 1890. They are primarily residential, with one church (Delanson Methodist Church) and one former commercial building.  They are generally two story, frame structures with clapboard siding and include representative buildings of the Late Victorian and Italianate styles.

It was listed on the National Register of Historic Places in 1984.

The district was described in a 1984 multiple resource study of Duanesburg properties.  It is described as having been developed in a relatively rapid manner between 1860 and 1890.

References

External links
Delanson United Methodist Church website

Historic districts in Schenectady County, New York
Victorian architecture in New York (state)
Italianate architecture in New York (state)
Historic districts on the National Register of Historic Places in New York (state)
National Register of Historic Places in Schenectady County, New York